Matias Vainionpää (born 2 October 2001) is a Finnish professional footballer who plays for SJK, as a defender.

References

2001 births
Living people
Finnish footballers
People from Seinäjoki
Seinäjoen Jalkapallokerho players
Veikkausliiga players
Association football defenders
Sportspeople from South Ostrobothnia